Totally Unseen: The Best of the Unseen is a greatest hits album by American punk rock band The Unseen, released in July 2000.

Track listing
"Are We Dead Yet" (Paul) – 2:58
"Alone" (Tripp, Scott, Paul) – 2:05
"What Are You Going to Do?" (Mark, Scott) – 2:19
"Stay Gold" – 1:43
"There's Still Hope" (Paul, Mark, Scott) – 3:54
"Goodbye America" (Paul) – 2:57
"Social Security" (Scott, Mark) – 2:04
"Greed Is a Disease" (Mark, Scott) – 1:21
"A.D.D." (Tripp) – :48
"Coincidence or Consequence" (Paul) – 2:20
"Systems Destruction" – 2:05
"Don't Be Fooled" (Tripp) – 1:34

References

External links
Totally Unseen @ discogs.com

The Unseen (band) albums
2000 compilation albums